The Lusatian Neisse is a river in Central Europe.

Neisse or Neiße (German) may also refer to:

Places
 Neisse (town), a former German town in Upper Silesia, now named Nysa, Poland
 Duchy of Neisse
Landkreis Neisse, a rural district in the Province of Upper Silesia
Spree-Neiße, a district in Brandenburg, Germany

Rivers
Lusatian Neisse, a left tributary of the Oder on the Polish-German border
Eastern Neisse, a left tributary of the Oder in Silesia
Raging Neisse, a left tributary of the Kaczawa (Katzbach) in Poland 
Little Neisse, left tributary of the Raging Neisse

People
Eberhard of Neisse, bishop of Warmia (1301–1326)
Eric Neisse (born 1964), French athlete
Hermann Neiße (1889–1932), German footballer

Other uses
Neisse University, a network of academic institutions in Czech Republic, Germany, and Poland
Battle of the Oder-Neisse, in early 1945
Oder-Neisse line, after 1945

See also
 
Nisa (disambiguation)
Nysa (disambiguation)
Nyssa (disambiguation)